Carson Eric "Shovel Shot" Cooper (July 17, 1897 – July 4, 1955) was a Canadian ice hockey player who played 8 seasons in the National Hockey League for the Boston Bruins, Montreal Canadiens, Detroit Cougars and Detroit Falcons between 1924 and 1932.

Born in Cornwall, Ontario, Cooper scored the winning goal for the Boston Bruins in the team's first NHL game on December 1, 1924. It was the Bruins' second goal in a 2-1 win against the other 1924-25 expansion team, the Montreal Maroons. Cooper later served as the Chief Scout with the Detroit Red Wings.  His name was engraved on the Stanley Cup in 1950, 1952 with Detroit. 

Cooper played senior lacrosse in Hamilton, Ontario in the early 1920s. He was teammates and roommates with future professional hockey players Hap Day, and future Canadian Amateur Hockey Association president Frank Sargent.

Career statistics

Regular season and playoffs

References

External links
 

1897 births
1955 deaths
Boston Bruins players
Canadian ice hockey right wingers
Detroit Cougars players
Detroit Falcons players
Detroit Olympics (IHL) players
Detroit Red Wings captains
Detroit Red Wings scouts
Ice hockey people from Ontario
Montreal Canadiens players
Ontario Hockey Association Senior A League (1890–1979) players
Sportspeople from Cornwall, Ontario
Stanley Cup champions
Windsor Bulldogs (1929–1936) players